The Marriage of Mademoiselle Beulemans (French:Le mariage de Mlle Beulemans) is a 1932 Belgian-French comedy film directed by Jean Choux. It is based on the 1910 Belgian play Le Mariage de mademoiselle Beulemans.

The film's sets were designed by the art director René Moulaert.

Cast
 Pierre Alcover as Monsieur Meulemeester
 Lily Bourget as Suzanne Beulemans
 Berthe Charmal as Madame Beulemans
 Arthur Devère as Isidore  
 Pierre Dux as Albert Delpierre
 Zizi Festerat as Mostynck  
 André Gobert as Séraphin Meulemeester
 Claire Gérard as Isabelle 
 Pierre Juvenet as Père Delpierre  
 Charles Mahieu as Monsieur Beulemans
 Solange Moret as Anna
 Ghita Moulaert 
 Charles Nossent 
 Rittche as Léopold  
 René Vitou

References

Bibliography 
 Goble, Alan. The Complete Index to Literary Sources in Film. Walter de Gruyter, 1999.

External links 
 

1932 films
Belgian comedy films
French comedy films
1932 comedy films
1930s French-language films
Films directed by Jean Choux
French black-and-white films
Belgian black-and-white films
French-language Belgian films
1930s French films